Abigail and Roger is a British television sitcom that aired on the BBC Television Service in 1956. It was written by Kelvin Sheldon. The programme saw Julie Webb and David Drummond play Abigail and Roger, an engaged couple living in London bedsits. The series is thought to no longer exist.

Cast
Julie Webb – Abigail
David Drummond – Roger
Rosina Enright – Shirl
John Stone – Clive
Grace Denbigh-Russell – Mrs Moloch

Plot
Abigail and Roger are an engaged couple living separately in bedsits in London. Abigail is a shorthand typist, who is outspoken and very capable domestically, she can mend a fuse, cook, drive and so on. Roger works in the City and is into keeping fit and planning for their future. Much of the humour arose from the different attitudes to life, and their interest in the attractions of London.

Episodes
The show was originally meant to run for thirteen weeks, as a summer replacement for the soap opera The Grove Family, but in fact only ran for nine weeks. The entire series is thought to be lost.

References
Mark Lewisohn, "Radio Times Guide to TV Comedy", BBC Worldwide Ltd, 2003
British TV Comedy Guide for Abigail And Roger

External links

1956 British television series debuts
1956 British television series endings
1950s British sitcoms
BBC television sitcoms
Lost BBC episodes
Television shows set in London